The Ontario Liberal Party ran a full slate of 103 candidates in the 1999 provincial election, and elected 35 Members of Provincial Parliament (MPPs) to form the official opposition in the provincial legislature.  Many of the party's candidates have their own biography pages; information about others may be found here.

Albert Koehl (Trinity—Spadina)
Koehl was a lawyer for the provincial Environment Ministry during the early 1990s (Globe and Mail, 4 June 1992), and later worked as a war crimes investigator for the United Nations.  In 1998, he contributed to a UN report on past human rights abuses in Guatemala.  He has also worked with aboriginal groups in Guatemala, and with Guatemalan refugees in Mexico.  In 2003, he wrote against General Efraín Ríos Montt's bid to return as President of Guatemala (Toronto Star, 9 November 2003).

He received 9,817 votes (27.48%), finishing second against New Democratic Party incumbent Rosario Marchese.  He was 39 years old (Toronto Star, 17 May 1999).

Koehl later became a founding member of the Education Rights Task Force, and has written about the difficulties faced by the children of illegal immigrants in attaining education in Canada (Toronto Star, 10 May 2002).  In 2005, he supported the provincial government of Dalton McGuinty's decision to remove an attendance fee for the children of some recent immigrants (Canada NewsWire, 19 May 2005).

He is also a lawyer with the Sierra Legal Defence Fund, and has written in support of the Kyoto Accord (Globe and Mail, 28 August 2002).  In 2003, he spoke out against plans for a logging road network near Pukaskwa National Park in Northern Ontario (Broadcast News, 12 August 2003).

Costas Manios (Scarborough Centre)
Costas Manios (born in Greece) is a politician in Toronto, Ontario, Canada.  A Liberal, he was nevertheless involved in a serious controversy with Ontario Liberal Party in the 2003 provincial election.

Prior to running for the provincial Liberal party, Manios was an executive assistant in the office of federal Liberal Member of Parliament John Cannis.  He was also a membership coordinator for the federal Liberal party in Ontario, and served as an executive director of the Hellenic-Canadian Federation of Ontario.

Manios first campaigned for the Ontario legislature in the 1999 provincial election, against Progressive Conservative incumbent Marilyn Mushinski in the eastern Toronto riding of Scarborough Centre.  Although Manios did not have a strong public profile when the election was called, he came within 4,000 votes of defeating Mushinski, and many believe he would have been elected had not been for vote-splitting with New Democratic Party candidate Sid Ryan, who received about 20% of the vote and took third-place.  After the election, Manios undertook extensive promotional work for the Liberal Party in Toronto.

Manios intended to run as a Liberal again in the 2003 election, and was bitterly disappointed when party leader Dalton McGuinty appointed Brad Duguid as the party's candidate in Scarborough Centre instead.  (Such appointments are permitted under the constitution of the Ontario Liberal Party, but are not commonly utilized.)  Manios and his supporters claimed that McGuinty had previously given Manios full sanction to run for the Liberal nomination again, and described Duguid's appointment as a betrayal of trust.  With the support of the local Liberal riding association, Manios entered the race as a "liberal independent candidate".  He officially appeared on the ballot as an independent, but used Liberal red and white colours in his campaign handouts.

Manios had a support base in Scarborough's Greek community, and many believed that he could split the vote with Duguid to allow Mushinski another victory.  In the event, however, provincial trends overrode local factors.  Duguid won a convincing majority over Mushinski, as the Liberals formed a majority government provincially.  Manios finished fourth, behind Michael Laxer of the NDP, with 3,259 votes (7.82%).  His vote total, while credible for an independent candidate, was not enough to influence the outcome.  After the election, Manios claimed that McGuinty and his supporters had drifted away from the party's principles.

1999